James L. Goddard (April 24, 1923 – December 18, 2009) was an American physician who served as the Director of the Communicable Disease Center from 1962 to 1966 and as Commissioner of Food and Drugs from 1966 to 1968.

He died of a brain hemorrhage on December 18, 2009, in Laguna Woods, California at age 86.

References

1923 births
2009 deaths
20th-century American physicians
Commissioners of the Food and Drug Administration
Directors of the Centers for Disease Control and Prevention
Kennedy administration personnel
Lyndon B. Johnson administration personnel
George Washington University School of Medicine & Health Sciences alumni
Harvard School of Public Health alumni